

Events

February events
 February 21 – The Cornishman Richard Trevithick's newly built "Penydarren" steam locomotive operates on the Merthyr Tramroad between Penydarren Ironworks in Merthyr Tydfil and Abercynon in South Wales, following several trials since February 13, the world's first locomotive to work on rails.

June events
 June 29 - British Parliamentary approval for the Oystermouth Railway in South Wales is granted, and the first tracks are laid.

Births
 Jean-Jacques Meyer, French steam locomotive designer (d. 1879)

Deaths

References